Madhubani art (also Mithila art) is a style of painting practiced in the Mithila region of India and Nepal. It is named after the Madhubani district of Bihar, India, which is where it originated. Artists create these  paintings using a variety of mediums, including their own fingers, or twigs, brushes, nib-pens, and matchstick. The paint is  created using natural dyes and pigments. The paintings are characterised by their eye-catching geometrical patterns. There is ritual content for particular occasions, such as birth or marriage, and festivals, such as Holi, Surya Shasti, Kali Puja, Upanayana, and Durga Puja.

Origin and tradition 
Madhubani painting (or Mithila painting) was traditionally created by the women of various communities in the Mithila region of the Indian subcontinent. It originated from Madhubani district of the Mithila region of Bihar. Madhubani is also a major export center of these paintings. This painting as a form of wall art was practiced widely throughout the region; the more recent development of painting on paper and canvas mainly originated among the villages around Madhubani, and it is these latter developments that led to the term "Madhubani art" being used alongside "Mithila Painting."

The paintings were traditionally done on freshly plastered mud walls and floors of huts, but now they are also done on cloth, handmade paper and canvas. Madhubani paintings are made from the paste of powdered rice. Madhubani painting has remained confined to a compact geographical area and the skills have been passed on through centuries, the content and the style have largely remained the same. Thus, Madhubani painting has received GI (Geographical Indication) status. Madhubani paintings use two-dimensional imagery, and the colors used are derived from plants. Ochre, Lampblack and Red are used for reddish-brown and black, respectively.

Symbols 
Mithila paintings mostly depict people and their association with nature and scenes and deities from the ancient epics. Natural objects like the sun, the moon, and religious plants like tulsi are also widely painted, along with scenes from the royal court and social events like weddings. In this paintings generally, no space is left empty; the gaps are filled by paintings of flowers, animals, birds, and even geometric designs. Traditionally, painting was one of the skills that was passed down from generation to generation in the families of the Mithila Region, mainly by women . It is still practiced and kept alive in institutions spread across the Mithila region. Asha Jha of Madhubanipaints in Darbhanga, Vaidehi in Madhubani, Benipatti in Madhubani district and Gram Vikas Parishad in Ranti are some of the major centres of Madhubani painting which have kept this ancient art form alive.

Styles 

Mithila art has five distinctive styles: 
 Bharni
 Katchni
 Tantrik
 Godna
 Kohbar

In the 1960s Bharni, and Tantrik styles were mainly done by Brahman women in India and Nepal. Their themes were mainly religious and they depicted Gods and Goddesses paintings. People of other castes included aspects of their daily life and symbols, the story of Raja Shailesh (guard of the village) and much more, in their paintings. Nowadays Madhubani art has become a globalised art form, so there is no difference in the work on the basis of the caste system. They work in all five styles. Mithila art has received worldwide attention.

Contributions 
The Madhubani painting tradition played a key role in the conservation efforts in India in 2012, where there was frequent deforestation in the state of Bihar. Shashthi Nath Jha, who runs the Gram Vikas Parishad, an NGO, started the initiative as an attempt to protect local trees that were being cut down in the name of expanding roads and development. The main reason behind this was that the trees were traditionally adorned with forms of gods and other religious and spiritual images such as those of Radha-Krishna, Rama-Sita, scenes from Ramayana and Mahabharata and other mythologies.

Darbhanga MP Gopal Jee Thakur started the tradition of honouring people with Mithila Painting in Indian Politics.

Awards 
Madhubani painting received official recognition in 1969 when Sita Devi received the State award by Government of Bihar. Mamta Devi from the village Jitwarpur has also got National Award. Jagdamba Devi from Bhajparaul, Madhubani was given Padma Shri in 1975 and the National Award to Sita Devi of Jitwarpur village near Madhubani. Jagdamba Devi's foster son Satya Narayan Lal Karn and his wife Moti Karn are also well-regarded Mithila artists, and they won the National Award jointly in 2003. Sita Devi received the Padma Shri in 1981. Sita Devi was also awarded by Bihar Ratna in 1984 and Shilp Guru in 2006. 

In 1984 Ganga Devi was awarded by Padma Shri. Mahasundari Devi received the Padma Shri in 2011. Baua Devi, Yamuna Devi, Shanti Devi, Chano Devi, Bindeshwari Devi, Chandrakala Devi, Shashi kala Devi, Leela Devi, Godavari Dutta, Asha Jha and Bharti Dayal were also given the National award. Chandrabhushan (Rasidpur), Ambika Devi (Rasidpur), Manisha Jha were also given the National award. In 2020, Madhubani artist Dulari Devi won the Padma Shri for contributions to art.

Gallery

References

Further reading 
 (see index: p. 148–152)
Old Traditional art by rural women, from Madhubani art gallery.

External links 

Artwork by various Madhubani Artists
In conversation with Indian Express, the Madhubani Artist Vidushini shares her views on preserving traditional art forms including Mithila Paintings.
India and Nepal's Mithila Art Is Having a Feminist Renaissance

Culture of Mithila
Indian paintings
Nepalese art
Mithila
Schools of Indian painting
Hindu art
Geographical indications in Bihar
Madhubani district
Indian folk art
Tourist attractions in Madhubani district
Culture of Madhesh